George Edward Goodall (10 July 1891 – 6 August 1963) was an Australian rules footballer who played with Collingwood in the Victorian Football League (VFL).

Notes

External links 

George Goodall's profile at Collingwood Forever

1891 births
1963 deaths
Australian rules footballers from Victoria (Australia)
Collingwood Football Club players